The Magritte Award for Most Promising Actor (French: Magritte du meilleur espoir masculin) is an award presented annually by the Académie André Delvaux. It is given in honor of a young actor who has delivered an outstanding breakthrough performance while working within the film industry. It is one of the Magritte Awards, which were established to recognize excellence in Belgian cinematic achievements. 

The 1st Magritte Awards ceremony was held in 2011 with Joffrey Verbruggen receiving the award for his role in The Boat Race. As of the 2022 ceremony, Günter Duret is the most recent winner in this category for his role in Playground.

Winners and nominees
In the list below, winners are listed first in the colored row, followed by the other nominees.

2010s

2020s

References

External links
 Magritte Awards official website
 Magritte Award for Most Promising Actor at AlloCiné

Promising Actor
Awards for young actors